The Austroriparian is a biogeographic province in the Southeastern United States. As designated by Miklos Udvardy, it includes the humid coniferous and mixed temperate forests of the Mississippi Alluvial Plain and the Atlantic Coastal Plain from eastern Texas to southeastern Virginia, including all but the southernmost portion of Florida, and covering portions of Alabama, Arkansas, Florida, Georgia, Louisiana, Mississippi, Missouri, North Carolina, South Carolina, Tennessee, Texas.

In the WWF designation of ecoregions, the Austroriparian province corresponds generally to the Mississippi lowland forests, Middle Atlantic coastal forests, Southeastern conifer forests, Florida Sand Pine Scrub, and the eastern portion of the Western Gulf coastal grasslands ecoregions.

The Austroriparian province corresponds to the southern portion of the Atlantic and Gulf Coastal Plain floristic province.

The name is compound of the Latin terms Austro (southern) and riparian (of the river bank).

References
 Dasmann, Raymond. "Biogeographical Provinces". CoEvolution Quarterly, No. 11, Fall 1976. Sausalito, CA.
 Ricketts, Taylor H., Eric Dinerstein, David M. Olson, Colby J. Loucks, et al. (1999). Terrestrial Ecoregions of North America: a Conservation Assessment. Island Press, Washington DC.

Temperate coniferous forests of the United States
Ecoregions of the United States

Plant communities of the Eastern United States
Plant communities of Alabama
Plant communities of Florida
Plant communities of Louisiana
Plant communities of Mississippi
Plant communities of North Carolina
Plant communities of South Carolina
Plant communities of Virginia
Nearctic ecoregions